This article lists players who have recently captained the Tipperary county hurling team in the Munster Senior Hurling Championship and the All-Ireland Senior Hurling Championship. 

The captain is normally chosen from the club that has won the Tipperary Senior Hurling Championship. This did not happen in 1989. In that year Loughmore Castleiney were the reigning county hurling champions but did not hold the captaincy during the championship as none of their players were deemed good enough to make the team. In 1989 therefore Pat McGrath of Loughmore Castleiney was the captain during the National Hurling League and Bobby Ryan of Borris-Ileigh was the captain during the Championship. Had McGrath played in a championship match he was deemed captain for that game, in other words had he come onto the field during the All Ireland he would have collected the trophy. 

The same situation arose in the 2008 season. Loughmore Castleiney were again the county champions and failed to maintain a presence on the team. Eoin Kelly and Paul Ormond were named as joint-captains. Ormond represented the Loughmore Castleiney club. Again if Ormond played he was the captain. However, on each occasion that a trophy was won both Kelly and Ormond collected it jointly. In all other cases the captain came from the county hurling champions club.

List of captains

References

External links
Tipperary GAA

Hurlers
Tipperary
+Captains